The Dino 308 GT4 and 208 GT4 (later Ferrari 308 GT4 and 208 GT4) were mid-engined V8 2+2 cars built by Ferrari. The Dino 308 GT4 was introduced in 1973 and supplemented by the 208 GT4 in 1975. The cars were sold with Dino badging (continuing the Dino brand to differentiate non-V12 Ferrari) until May 1976, when they received Ferrari badging. The GT4 was replaced by the Mondial 8 in 1980 after a production run of 2,826 308s and 840 208s.

Design

The GT4 was a groundbreaking model for Ferrari in several ways: it was the first production Ferrari to feature the mid-engined V8 layout that would become the bulk of the company's business in the succeeding decades, and was the first production Ferrari with Bertone (rather than Pininfarina) designed bodywork. Pininfarina was upset by the decision to give cross-town rival Bertone the design, considering all they had done for Ferrari. The styling featured angular lines entirely different from its curvaceous 2-seater brother, the Dino 246, and was controversial at the time. Some journalists compared it to the Bertone-designed Lancia Stratos and Lamborghini Urraco, also penned by Marcello Gandini.
From the cockpit the driver sees only the road. Enzo Ferrari himself took a major role in its design, even having a mock-up made where he could sit in the car to test different steering, pedals and cockpit seating positioning.

Specifications

The chassis was a tubular spaceframe based on the Dino 246, but was stretched for a  wheelbase to make room for the second row of seats. The suspension was fully independent, with double wishbones, anti-roll bars, coaxial telescopic shock absorbers and coil springs on both axles.  There are claims that Niki Lauda was involved in suspension setup but that is incorrect as Lauda had not joined Ferrari until after the launch of the GT4 and the final specification would have been decided some time before that. The confusion lies in advertising by the USA importer Chinetti which wrongly claimed Lauda's involvement. Some creative licence when sales were difficult.

The 2.9 L (2926.90 cc) V8 was mounted transversally integrally joined with the 5-speed transaxle gearbox. It fitted 205/70VR14 Michelin XWX
The induction system used four Weber 40 DCNF carburetors.

308 GT4

The Dino 308 GT4 was introduced at the Paris Motor Show in November 1973. The 308 GT4 finally gained the "Prancing Horse" badge in May 1976, which replaced the Dino badges on the hood, wheels, rear panel and the steering wheel while retaining the Dino 308GT4 logo on the rear boot lid. This has caused major confusion over the years by owners, enthusiasts and judges. During the energy crisis at that time many prospective owners were hesitant to buy such an expensive automobile not badged "Ferrari" being confused at the significance of the Dino name. Dino was Enzo Ferrari's son who died in 1956, and his name was to honor his memory on the models it was placed. 

In an effort to improve sales until the 1976 official re-badging, Ferrari sent out factory update #265/1 on July 1, 1975 with technical and cosmetic revisions in many areas. Some of these revisions were implemented piecemeal by dealers. Some made all the revisions while some just made a few. This leaves many 1975 GT4's with a variety of modifications which are hard to document as "correct" to aficionados who may not understand the complicated series of events surrounding this model year. Some of the revisions included adding Prancing Horse badges, repainting in the Boxer two-tone scheme (lower half painted matte black), air conditioning fixes, etc. It also included bumper modification and exhaust changes for North American versions. The Dino 308 GT4 was the only Ferrari legally imported to the US in 1975, and it was also the year Niki Lauda won the Formula One drivers championship and Ferrari won the constructors title.
The GT4 was the only 2+2 Ferrari ever raced with factory support.

There were two series of GT4; the earlier cars featured a twin distributor engine and foglamps mounted in the front valance. Later cars had a single distributor engine, with foglamps mounted behind the front grille.

208 GT4

Introduced at the Geneva Motor Show in 1975, the 208 GT4 was a low-displacement version of the V8 produced for the Italian market, where cars with engines larger than two litres were subjected to more than double VAT (38%). The engine was de-bored to (66.8 by 71 mm) 2.0 L (1990.64 cc) V8, resulting in the smallest production V8 in history for a road car.

Smaller Weber 34 DCNF carburetors, a lower final drive ratio and skinnier tires completed the technical changes for the 208. Chrome (rather than black) accents outside and the lack of fog lights were external visual indicators of the smaller-engined GT4. Inside the 208 GT4 featured a black rather than silver dash facing.

The 208 GTB replaced the 208 GT4 in 1980, after only 840 cars had been built.

References

Bibliography
 
 
 

GT4
Sports cars
Rear mid-engine, rear-wheel-drive vehicles
Cars introduced in 1973
Bertone vehicles
1980s cars